Dan Beehler is a Canadian musician. He was the original drummer and lead vocalist of speed metal band Exciter from its inception in 1978 to 1993, and rejoined the band in 2014. Beehler is known as the backbone of Exciter, which had been a forerunner of speed and thrash metal ever since its debut album, Heavy Metal Maniac, which was released some months before Metallica's Kill 'Em All. 

Although he did not perform vocals on the band's 1988 self-titled album, he continued to play drums until the band split after the release of Better Live Than Dead in 1993. After Exciter, Beehler formed his own band 'Beehler' and has been dedicated to it ever since. In April 2014, Beehler returned to Exciter.

References

External links 
Interview on voicesfromthedarkside.de

Living people
Year of birth missing (living people)
Place of birth missing (living people)
Canadian heavy metal drummers
Canadian male drummers
Canadian heavy metal singers